CKSB-FM (89.9 MHz) is a public radio station in Winnipeg, Manitoba, owned by the Canadian Broadcasting Corporation. It carries Radio-Canada's Ici Musique network, airing a mix of adult album alternative (AAA), classical music and other genres.

CKSB-FM has an effective radiated power of 61,000 watts, broadcasting from the Starbuck Communications Tower.

History
On August 21, 2001, the CRTC approved the CBC's application to launch the new French language radio station. CKSB-FM signed on the air December 23, 2001.

Transmitters
CKSB-FM also has rebroadcast transmitters in Saskatchewan:

Both rebroadcasters for Regina and Saskatoon were approved by the CRTC on April 30, 2002.

See also
 CKSB-10-FM
 CBWFT-DT

References

External links
 
 

KSB
KSB
KSB
Franco-Manitoban culture
Radio stations established in 2001
2001 establishments in Manitoba